Weekes is a surname. Notable people with the surname include:
 Ambrose Weekes (1919–2012), British priest, bishop of Gibraltar
 Anthony Weekes, English Member of Parliament in 1563
 Cecil Weekes (1931–2012), Church of Ireland minister
 Clara Weekes (1852-1937), Australian educator, suffragist, labor leader and pacifist
 Claire Weekes (1903–1990), Australian general practitioner and health writer
 Dallon Weekes (born 1981), American musician, singer, and songwriter
 Donald Weekes (born 1930), former English cricketer
 Elias Weekes (1809–1881), Australian ironmonger and politician
 Sir Everton Weekes (1925–2020), leading former West Indian cricketer
 Hampton Weekes (1880–1948), English priest who was Archdeacon of the Isle of Wight
 Harold Weekes (1880–1950), American football player
 Henry Weekes (1807–1877), English sculptor of the mid-Victorian period
 Herbert William Weekes (1841–1914), English genre and animal painter of the Victorian Neoclassical period
 James Weekes (1911–1977), American sailor and Olympic champion
 Ken Weekes (1912–1998), West Indian cricketer
 Kevin Weekes (born 1975), retired Canadian ice hockey goaltender
 Lesroy Weekes (born 1971), West Indian cricketer who played for the Leeward Islands and English counties
 Liz Weekes (born 1971), Australian water polo player and Olympic champion
 Nick Weekes (born 1981), former English cricketer
 Paul Weekes (born 1969), former English cricketer
 Randy Weekes (born 1956), Canadian politician
 William Weekes (died 1806), lawyer and political figure in Upper Canada

See also
 Dan Weekes-Hannah (born 1987), New Zealand-born actor
 Roderick Kinkead-Weekes (born 1951), former South African-born English cricketer
 Weeks (disambiguation)
 Weelkes
 Wicks (disambiguation)